Deconica neocaledonica is a species of mushroom in the family Strophariaceae. It has been found in New Caledonia and in Mount Halimun Salak National Park in Java, Indonesia. It is very similar to Deconica aureicystidiata.

References

Strophariaceae
Fungi described in 1979
Fungi of Asia
Fungi of New Caledonia
Taxa named by Gastón Guzmán